The 2007 Swedish Touring Car Championship season was the 12th Swedish Touring Car Championship (STCC) season. The championship was won by Fredrik Ekblom, becoming the first ever three-times STCC champion.

Teams and drivers
These were the entries for the 2007 Season.

Race Calendar

Championship standings

Drivers

References

External links
 Official site

Swedish Touring Car Championship seasons
Swedish Touring Car Championship
Swedish Touring Car Championship season